

People
Abraham Zangen
Gustav-Adolf von Zangen
Wilhelm Zangen

Fictional company
List of The Big Bang Theory and Young Sheldon characters#Zangen